"The Wild Life" is a song written and performed by English girl group Bananarama. Written in two days, the track was composed for and included in the 1984 American film of the same name The Wild Life  (starring Christopher Penn), and on its soundtrack.  Bananarama's second, self-titled album had already been in stores for several months when this single was issued, and for a time the album was re-released with "The Wild Life" included.  The song was released as a single in the U.S., Canada, Australia, and Japan.  The UK was instead given the song "Hot Line to Heaven" as the album's final single.

"The Wild Life" peaked at number 70 on the U.S. Billboard Hot 100 and did not chart in any other countries.  The Bananarama track listing was reverted to its original sequence shortly thereafter and "The Wild Life" did not appear on CD until the 2002 hits package The Essentials.

Music video
The music video was in light rotation on MTV in autumn 1984. It features the girls performing the song in a studio filled with colourful fabrics that they play around with. Their footage is intercut with excerpts from the film and photographs of the group members.

This video marked a break with their earlier work as it didn't attempt to create a storyline, and focused on them performing the song, accompanied by various images.

Reception
Cash Box magazine said "Again spotlighting vocal layering and a big production sound, this track features a minor key melody which is perfect for Bananarama's
harmonic interaction and it is also another potentially big dance favourite. Sure to get important exposure from the film, 'The Wild Life' should be another top- charting Single for the group, with special appeal on hit radio and new music formats."

Track listings
 USA / Canada / Japan / Australia 7-inch vinyl single
USA: London Records 882 019-7 / Canada: London Records LDS 218 / Australia: Liberation Records LS 1430 
"The Wild Life"  3:17
"State I'm In"  2:44

 USA / Canada 12" vinyl single
USA: London Records 882 019-1
"The Wild Life"  3:17
"State I'm In" (Extended Version)  2:48
"The Wild Life" (Dub Mix)  7:07

Charts

References 

1983 songs
1984 singles
Bananarama songs
London Records singles
Songs written by Sara Dallin
Songs written by Siobhan Fahey
Songs written by Keren Woodward
Songs written by Tony Swain (musician)
Songs written by Steve Jolley (songwriter)
Song recordings produced by Jolley & Swain